Antoni "Toni" Bernadó Planas (born 9 December 1966) is an Andorran long-distance runner who finished 87th in Men's marathon at the 1996 Summer Olympics, 49th at the 2000 Summer Olympics, 57th at the 2004 Summer Olympics, 58th at the 2008 Summer Olympics and 74th at the 2012 Summer Olympics. He is the first and so far only athlete to have finished five Olympic Marathons. He held the Masters M40 3000 metres world record for three years.

Personal bests
3000 metres – 8:03.69 (Palafrugell 2007)
5000 metres – 14:10.06 (Mataró 2005)
10,000 metres – 29:47.74 (Vic 2002)
Half marathon – 1:05:24 (Barcelona 2005)
Marathon – 2:14:25 (Barcelona 2003)

Competition record

Notes

References

External links 
 
 
 

1966 births
Living people
People from Sant Julià de Lòria
Andorran male marathon runners
Andorran male long-distance runners
Olympic athletes of Andorra
Athletes (track and field) at the 1996 Summer Olympics
Athletes (track and field) at the 2000 Summer Olympics
Athletes (track and field) at the 2004 Summer Olympics
Athletes (track and field) at the 2008 Summer Olympics
Athletes (track and field) at the 2012 Summer Olympics
World Athletics Championships athletes for Andorra
Athletes (track and field) at the 2001 Mediterranean Games
Mediterranean Games competitors for Andorra